Ask Rufus is the platinum-selling fifth studio album by funk band Rufus (and their third album featuring singer Chaka Khan), released on the ABC Records label in 1977. The album spent three weeks atop the Billboard R&B Albums Chart in 1977.

Background

By 1977, Rufus and Chaka Khan, now a fragile yet still tight unit, were starting to drift in different directions. Recording sessions for this album were troublesome due to tensions between Khan and drummer Andre Fischer. Khan's recent marriage to businessman Richard Holland had driven a wedge between Khan and Fischer. Khan would later report that during a session, with Holland present, Fischer and Holland had an altercation over a song that led into a fight at the bathroom.  Upon hearing the struggle, Khan fought Fischer and bandmates reportedly had to carry her away from Fischer.

As a result, the recording of Ask Rufus was longer than other albums. Ask Rufus would turn out to be the final album to feature Fischer, who was a member of the group for five years. Despite his departure, Ask Rufus continued the group's success as they headed to the late 1970s.  On the plus side, they gained another band member via this session.  Keyboardist David "Hawk" Wolinski joined up with the band after a stint with Madura, thus complementing founding member Kevin Murphy's playing as well.  Also former member Dennis Belfield returned to co-write "Everlasting Love" with Wolinski and Murphy.

Reception and legacy 

Ask Rufus was the band's second album to top Billboards R&B Albums chart and also reached No. 14 on Pop. The album includes the singles "At Midnight (My Love Will Lift You Up)", their third No. 1 hit on the R&B Singles chart and also No. 37 on Dance and No. 30 on Pop, "Hollywood" (US R&B No. 3, US Pop No. 32) and "Everlasting Love" (US R&B No. 17). In 1978, the Ask Rufus album earned the band their second Grammy Award nomination for Best R&B Performance by a Duo or Group with Vocal.

In a contemporary review, Billboard called Ask Rufus "the work of a wholly matured artist" and Khan "a fully-rounded r&b-rock vocalist who can be silky as well as a raunchy screamer". Carol Wetzel from the Spokane Daily Chronicle found the music "totally mature and full" yet danceable and highlighted by Khan's versatility and fluidity as a singer. Village Voice critic Robert Christgau was less impressed, disregarding her development into a "sophisticated song stylist" because he felt she still lacked "sophisticated songs" to sing.

The track "Hollywood" was later covered by Erykah Badu on the soundtrack to Spike Lee's 2000 movie Bamboozled, as well as being interpolated in India.Arie's song "Little Things" on her second album, Voyage to India; "Everlasting Love" was covered by Mary J. Blige on the 1996 Olympic Games album Rhythm of The Games and was also covered by Vanessa Williams on her seventh album titled Everlasting Love  (2005)

In 2020, Rolling Stone ranked the album at number 499 in their updated list of the 500 Greatest Albums of All Time.

Track listing

Personnel
Rufus
Chaka Khan – lead vocals, background vocals
Tony Maiden – guitar, background vocals
Kevin Murphy – keyboards, background vocals
Bobby Watson – bass, background vocals
André Fischer – drums, background vocals
David "Hawk" Wolinski – keyboards, background vocals
with:
Milt Holland – percussion
Ronnie Wood – guitar on "A Flat Fry"

Production
Rufus – producers
Gary Starr – engineer
Michael Schuman – assistant engineer
Clare Fischer – string arrangements and conductor
Charles Garnett, Tony Maiden – horn arrangements on "At Midnight (My Love Will Lift You Up)"
Brett Lopez - photography

ChartsAlbumSingles'''

Later Samples
"Close the Door"
"Who's Crew" by Tracey Lee from the album Many Facez"Better Days"
"Finally Made It (Interlude)" by Mary J. Blige from the album Love & LifeSee also
List of number-one R&B albums of 1977 (U.S.)

References

External linksAsk Rufus'' at Discogs

1977 albums
Rufus (band) albums
Chaka Khan albums
ABC Records albums